is a Tokyo Metro railway station in Shinjuku, Tokyo, Japan.

Lines

Station layout 
The station has two side platforms serving two tracks.

Platforms

History 
Nishi-Shinjuku Station opened on May 28, 1996.

The station facilities were inherited by Tokyo Metro after the privatization of the Teito Rapid Transit Authority (TRTA) in 2004.

Surrounding area 

 Tokyo Medical University Hospital
 Tochōmae Station (Toei Ōedo Line)
 Shinjuku Police Hall
 Kogakuin University

References

External link 

Railway stations in Tokyo
Railway stations in Japan opened in 1996
Tokyo Metro Marunouchi Line
Stations of Tokyo Metro